Thomas Neil Vant (born July 11, 1944) is an Anglican clergyman, prospector, businessman and former political figure in British Columbia. He represented Cariboo from 1986 to 1991 in the Legislative Assembly of British Columbia as a Social Credit member.

He was born in Nelson, British Columbia, the son of Thomas E. Vant and Helen Isabel Simpson, and was educated in Quesnel, at the B.C. Vocational School, at the University of British Columbia and at the Vancouver School of Theology. In 1970, he married Jeanne Stanton Parmucker. Vant served in the provincial cabinet as Minister of Transportation and Highways.

References 

1944 births
British Columbia Social Credit Party MLAs
Canadian Anglican priests
Living people
Members of the Executive Council of British Columbia
People from Nelson, British Columbia
University of British Columbia alumni